James Gray (1875–1937) was an English footballer who played in the Football League for Aston Villa.

References

1875 births
1937 deaths
English footballers
Association football midfielders
English Football League players
Abercorn F.C. players
Clyde F.C. players
Royal Albert F.C. players
Bristol Rovers F.C. players
Aston Villa F.C. players
Rangers F.C. players
Tottenham Hotspur F.C. players
Leyton Orient F.C. players
People from Keynsham